The Socialist Party of Castile and León (PSCyL) is the Castilian-Leonese federation of the Spanish Socialist Workers' Party (PSOE), the main centre-left party in Spain since the 1970s.

Electoral performance

Cortes of Castile and León

Cortes Generales

European Parliament

References

Castile and León
Political parties in Castile and León
Political parties with year of establishment missing
Social democratic parties in Spain